Turan-e Fars (also Romanized as Tūrān-e Fārs; also known as Tūrān-e Fārsī) is a village in Daland Rural District, in the Central District of Ramian County, Golestan Province, Iran. At the 2006 census, its population was 2,492, in 652 families.

References 

Populated places in Ramian County